contact GHACEM on the following numbers[0202053021,0596645250Ghana Cement also known as Ghacem' was founded by the Government of Ghana in collaboration with Norcem AS of Norway, on August 30, 1967. It is the largest producer of cement in Ghana. Ghacem has since inception produced more than 30 million tons of cement.

See also 

 Diamond Cement Ghana Limited

References

External links 

 Official Website

Cement companies of Ghana
Manufacturing companies established in 1967
1967 establishments in Ghana
Tema